Aleksei Aleksandrovich Filippov (born 2 March 1975) is a former Russian professional football player.

Club career
He played 5 seasons in the Russian Football National League for FC Druzhba Maykop. Filippov is Druzhba's all-time leader in matches played in the Russian First Division with 253.

References

1975 births
Living people
Russian footballers
People from Maykop
Association football defenders
Sportspeople from Adygea